The 2013 Alberta Scotties Tournament of Hearts, Alberta's women's provincial curling championship, was held from January 23 to 27 at the Lethbridge Curling Club in Lethbridge, Alberta. The winning Kristie Moore rink from Grande Prairie went on to represent Alberta at the 2013 Scotties Tournament of Hearts in Kingston, Ontario.

Qualification
Twelve teams will qualify for the provincial tournament through several berths. The qualification process is as follows:

Teams

Knockout Draw Brackets

A event

B event

C event

Knockout results
All draw times are listed in Mountain Standard Time (UTC−7).

Draw 1
Wednesday, January 23, 9:30 am

Draw 2
Wednesday, January 23, 6:30 pm

Draw 3
Thursday, January 24, 9:00 am

Draw 4
Thursday, January 24, 2:00 pm

Draw 5
Thursday, January 24, 6:30 pm

Draw 6
Friday, January 25, 9:00 am

Draw 7
Friday, January 25, 2:00 pm

Draw 8
Friday, January 25, 6:30 pm

Draw 9
Saturday, January 26, 1:00 pm

Playoffs

A1 vs. B1
Saturday, January 26, 6:30 pm

C1 vs. C2
Saturday, January 26, 6:30 pm

Semifinal
Sunday, January 27, 9:30 am

Final
Sunday, January 27, 2:00 pm

Qualification events

Northern Alberta Curling Association
The Northern Alberta Curling Association qualification event for the 2013 Alberta Scotties Tournament of Hearts took place from January 3 to 6 at the Cold Lake Curling Club in Cold Lake. The event qualified three teams to the provincial playdowns.

Teams
The teams are listed as follows:

Results
The draw is listed as follows:

Southern Alberta Curling Association
The Southern Alberta Curling Association qualification event for the 2013 Alberta Scotties Tournament of Hearts is taking place from January 3 to 6 at the Glencoe Curling Club in Calgary. The event will qualify three teams to the provincial playdowns.

Teams
The teams are listed as follows:

Results

Peace Curling Association
The Peace Curling Association qualification event for the 2013 Alberta Scotties Tournament of Hearts took place from January 4 to 6 in Dawson Creek, British Columbia. The event qualified two teams to the provincial playdowns.

Teams

Results
Moore and DeJong played a two-game series to determine the ranking they would receive in the provincials, which affects the placement of teams in the provincials draw. Moore won the first game with a score of 8–6, but DeJong won the second game with a score of 12–2. The two teams then played a skills competition, which Moore won, giving her the A ranking and DeJong the B ranking.

References

External links

Alberta
Sport in Lethbridge
Curling in Alberta
Scotties Tournament of Hearts
Alberta Scotties Tournament of Hearts